Bad Bevensen (West Low German: Bemsen) is a town in the north of the district Uelzen in Lower Saxony, Germany. It is situated to the east of the Lüneburg Heath (Lüneburger Heide). The Ilmenau river, a tributary of the Elbe, flows through Bad Bevensen. Bad Bevensen is a well-known spa town.

Bad Bevensen is the seat of the Samtgemeinde ("collective municipality") Bevensen-Ebstorf.

Incorporated into the municipality are the villages of Gollern, Groß Hesebeck, Jastorf, Klein Bünstorf, Klein Hesebeck, Medingen, Röbbel, Sasendorf and Seedorf. It is the site of an Iron Age cemetery which gave the name of the Jastorf culture.

In the run-up to the G20 summit in 2017, left-wing extremists set a fire in the town.

International relations

Twin towns – Sister cities
Bad Bevensen is twinned with:
 Chojnice Poland

Notable people

Wilhelm Wallmann (born 1941), politician (CDU)
Ilse Falk (born 1943), politician and Member of Parliament (CDU)
Dirk Fischer (born 1943), politician (CDU)
Jörg Sennheiser (born 1944), entrepreneur
Ulrich Sinn (born 1945), Professor of Classical Archaeology
Joachim Eigenherr (born 1947), athlete
Volker Bescht (born 1951), Brigadier General of the Bundeswehr
Heinrich Lange (born 1955), Vice Admiral of the German navy
Christian Dexne (born 1971), sports presenter (ARD / RBB)

See also
 Gustav Stresemann Institute

References

External links 

Uelzen (district)
Spa towns in Germany